there were 7,255 subdistricts (tambons) in Thailand. An alphabetical list of them follows:

List of tambon in Thailand (A)
List of tambon in Thailand (B)
List of tambon in Thailand (C)
List of tambon in Thailand (D)
List of tambon in Thailand (E–F)
List of tambon in Thailand (H–I)
List of tambon in Thailand (K)
List of tambon in Thailand (L)
List of tambon in Thailand (M)
List of tambon in Thailand (N–O)
List of tambon in Thailand (P)
List of tambon in Thailand (R)
List of tambon in Thailand (S)
List of tambon in Thailand (T)
List of tambon in Thailand (U–V)
List of tambon in Thailand (W)
List of tambon in Thailand (Y)

References

Tambon
 List of